Bullets of Justice is a film made by Valeri Milev and Timur Turisbekov. Originally shot in 2017 as a pilot episode for a series, after a reconsideration of a concept it was eventually extended into a full feature film premiering at London FrightFest Film Festival on the 23rd of August 2019.

Plot 
The action takes place in the United States in the days of the Third World War. The American government initiates a secret project code named "Army Bacon" in order to create super soldier by inbreeding human beings with pigs. Twenty five years later a breed called "Muzzles" have occupied the top of the food chain, farming and eating well-fattened humans like livestock.

Rob Justice (Timur Turisbekov) is an ex-bounty hunter working for the last line of human resistance - a group of survivors hiding in a nuclear bunker deep underground. Justice is hired to find out how the "muzzles" came to power and how to destroy them.

Cast 
 Danny Trejo as Grave-digger
 Timur Turisbekov as Rob Justice
 Yana Marinova as Nina
 Dessy Slavova as Lena
 Doroteya Toleva as Raksha
 Ester Chardaklieva as Olga

Film crew 
 Director — Valeri Milev
 Screenwriters — Valeri Milev, Timur Turisbekov
 Producer — Timur Turisbekov
 Operator — Orlin Ruevski
 Costume designer — Nikolai Kirilov

Production 
The pilot episode was shot in 2017 in Kazakhstan and is a sequel of the Project Zenit group’s clip  “Қанағаттандырылмағандықтарыңыздан” shot by Timur Turisbekov. In January 2017, a crowdfunding crowd-funding project was launched at Indiegogo to raise $100,000 USD as funds for the film post-production. On January 31, a trailer was released. A film commercial was also shot showing more details of the filming process and participants. The movie was filmed in 17 days.
 
Even before the release, the show was being compared with another movie — Range 15, similar to Bullets of Justice in terms of genre and "lavishly decorated in gore", and Danny Trejo's participation in both films. It is considered that this project "has all chances to occupy its place in the world catalog of the most bloody films in Category B", and that "the show promises to be piggishly epic." Timur Turisbekov himself describes the project as "a grim satire created by a circle of friends".

References

External links
 

2019 films
Crowdfunding
Kazakhstani science fiction films
Post-apocalyptic films
2019 science fiction action films
2010s English-language films